Übersyren or Uebersyren is a small town in the commune of Schuttrange, in southern Luxembourg.  , the town has a population of 4,144.

Schuttrange
Towns in Luxembourg